Tatoosh is a  private yacht owned by the estate of Paul Allen. 

She is currently the world's 60th largest superyacht.

History
Originally built for mobile phone magnate Craig McCaw, Tatoosh was built at Rendsburg in Germany by Nobiskrug and completed in June 2000.  Design and Construction by Kusch Yachts. It was purchased by Paul Allen in 2001 at a reported cost of $100 million.

Tatoosh was hired for £400,000 by Teodorín Nguema Obiang, the son of Equatorial Guinean president Teodoro Obiang Nguema Mbasogo, for a Christmas cruise when he entertained rap singer Eve.

The listing was withdrawn in 2014 after failing to attract a buyer.

In January 2016,  Tatoosh destroyed 14,000 square feet of coral reef in the West Bay replenishment zone in the Cayman Islands according to officials. The owners of the Tatoosh released a statement that the mooring location was explicitly directed by the local port authority.

Features
Tatoosh's features include:

Five decks;
a master suite, a saloon and other rooms on the top deck;
a saloon with a French limestone fireplace, a dining area, staterooms and a ladies' powder room on the main deck;
a movie theatre;
facilities to transport two helicopters on the top two decks;
custom  power and sailboats
beach club with dive center

References

Motor yachts
Ships built in Rendsburg
2000 ships